Rahim Hobbenaghi (born in January 1960, Urmia) is an Iranian professor, veterinarian, and university president. He has been the President of Urmia University from 1997 to 2001; and again from 2014 to 2021.

Early life
Hobbenaghi was born in January 1960 in the city of Urmia, West Azerbaijan Province, Iran. He studied in Urmia up to high school. In 1979 he was accepted into a veterinary program at the University of Tehran. He graduated with a PhD in Veterinary Medicine in 1985 and a specialty in Veterinary Pathology in 1995.

Hobbenaghi is also a veteran of the Iran–Iraq War and participated in the Before the Dawn, Dawn 1, and Dawn 2 operations as a member of 31 Ashura army.

According to the site of Iranian higher education (Ministry of Science) on January 1, 2018, Dr. Hobbenaghi was selected for a second consecutive term and will be the university's president for the next four years starting from February 2018. He is the first to serve three non consecutive terms.

References

|-

|-

People from Urmia
1960 births
Living people
Presidents of Urmia University